Matthew Paul Reynolds (born October 2, 1984) is an American former professional baseball pitcher. He played in Major League Baseball (MLB) for the Colorado Rockies, Arizona Diamondbacks, and San Francisco Giants.

Professional career

Colorado Rockies
Reynolds was drafted by the Colorado Rockies in the 20th round of the 2007 Major League Baseball draft.

Reynolds was called up to the majors for the first time on August 19, 2010.

Arizona Diamondbacks
He was traded to the Arizona Diamondbacks on November 20, 2012, in exchange for Ryan Wheeler. On June 10, 2013, Reynolds was placed on the 15-day disabled list with a left elbow strain. On September 24, Reynolds underwent Tommy John surgery, sidelining him for at least most of 2014. In 30 games in 2013, Reynolds went 0–2 with 5 holds, 2 saves and a 1.98 ERA, striking out 23 in 27.1 innings.

On October 15, 2013, Reynolds signed a one-year, $550,000 deal with a $600,000 club option for 2015. On March 29, 2016, Reynolds was released by the Diamondbacks.

Lancaster Barnstormers
On April 20, 2016, Reynolds signed with the Lancaster Barnstormers of the Atlantic League of Professional Baseball.

San Francisco Giants
On June 24, 2016, Reynolds contract was purchased by the San Francisco Giants and he was assigned to their AA level. On July 14, 2016, Reynolds was promoted to the AAA Sacramento River Cats (San Francisco Giants). On July 28, Reynolds was called up from the minors when Josh Osich was placed on the DL.

In December 2016, Reynolds signed a minor league contract with the San Francisco Giants. He elected free agency on November 6, 2017.

Return to Lancaster
On March 19, 2018, Reynolds signed with the Lancaster Barnstormers of the Atlantic League of Professional Baseball. He announced his retirement on August 26, 2018.

References

External links

1984 births
Living people
Baseball players from Knoxville, Tennessee
Major League Baseball pitchers
Colorado Rockies players
Arizona Diamondbacks players
San Francisco Giants players
Austin Peay Governors baseball players
Tri-City Dust Devils players
Asheville Tourists players
Modesto Nuts players
Tulsa Drillers players
Scottsdale Scorpions players
Colorado Springs Sky Sox players
Reno Aces players
Lancaster Barnstormers players
Richmond Flying Squirrels players
Sacramento River Cats players
Rochester Honkers players